Jannat Zubair Rahmani (born 29 August 2001) is an Indian actress who predominantly acts in Hindi-language television shows and films. She is best known for portraying Kashi in Kashi – Ab Na Rahe Tera Kagaz Kora, Phulwa in Phulwa and Pankti in Tu Aashiqui. In 2022, Rahmani participated on Colors TV's stunt-based show Fear Factor: Khatron Ke Khiladi 12, where she finished at 4th place.

Early life and education 
Rahmani was born to Zubair Ahmad Rahmani and Nazneen Zubair Rahmani on 29 August 2001 in Mumbai.

In 2019, Zubair scored 81% in her class XII HSC boards. She is currently pursuing graduation from a private college in Kandivali, Mumbai.

Career 
She started her acting career in 2010 with Star One's medical, romance Dill Mill Gayye where she played the cameo role of a young patient Tamanna, but gained recognition as child artist through Imagine TV's Kashi – Ab Na Rahe Tera Kagaz Kora and Colors TV's Phulwa in 2010 and 2011 respectively. She then played the role of Young Phool Kanwar in Bharat Ka Veer Putra–Maharana Pratap

In 2017, Rahmani starred in Colors TV's romantic Tu Aashiqui played main role of Pankti Sharma Dhanrajgir. In 2018, she was seen in the Bollywood film Hichki, where she played the role of a student.

In 2022, she was a contestant in Colors TV's stunt-based reality show Fear Factor: Khatron Ke Khiladi 12, where she ended up at 4th position. She made her Punjabi film debut Kulche Chole alongside Dilraj Grewal, which released on 11 November 2022.

Media image 
In January 2020, Jannat was brought in as the brand ambassador of UBON, a well-known brand in the tech industry.

In 2022, Rahmani featured in Forbes 30 Under 30 list in the "Media, Marketing and Advertising" category.

Filmography

Films

Television

Special appearances

Music videos

Discography

Awards and nominations

References

External links 

 

2001 births
Living people
Indian film actresses
Indian child actresses
Actresses in Hindi cinema
Indian television child actresses
Indian television actresses
21st-century Indian actresses
Fear Factor: Khatron Ke Khiladi participants